Zamarkova is a settlement in the Municipality of Lenart in northeastern Slovenia. It lies on the left bank of the Pesnica River in the Slovene Hills. The area is part of the traditional region of Styria. It is now included in the Drava Statistical Region.

A number of Roman period burial mounds have been identified near the settlement.

References

External links

Zamarkova on Geopedia

Populated places in the Municipality of Lenart